Elizabeth Kirkeby was a 15th-century English goldsmith and merchant.

She was born in London to an artisan family, and married John Kirkeby, a goldsmith (died 1482).

When she was widowed in 1482, she took over and managed the business of her late spouse. She manufactured and sold gold pieces, and subsequently expanded to open a mercantile shop and a shipping firm. She never remarried, which in the law of the time would have meant becoming a minor and giving up her business to her spouse. She employed many assistants, especially to act has her business agents in her transactions on the Continent.

She was one of the wealthiest women in London when she died.

References

External Links
 English Goldsmith and Merchant

15th-century English businesspeople
15th-century English women
15th-century English people
Medieval businesswomen
English goldsmiths
English merchants